Sphenogrypa is a genus of moth in the family Gelechiidae. It contains the species Sphenogrypa syncosma, which is found in Kenya.

References

Endemic moths of Kenya
Gelechiinae